Totua is a monotypic genus of Brazilian sheet weavers containing the single species, Totua gracilipes. It was first described by Eugen von Keyserling in 1891, and is only found in Brazil.

See also
 List of Linyphiidae species (Q–Z)

References

Linyphiidae
Monotypic Araneomorphae genera
Spiders of Brazil
Taxa named by Eugen von Keyserling